Mount Mayabobo is a cinder cone situated at the base of Mount Banahaw, in Barangay Mayabobo, Candelaria, Quezon in Luzon island, Philippines.

Sources
 Global Volcanism Program: Banáhao: Synonyms and Subfeatures

Mountains of the Philippines
Volcanoes of Luzon
Cinder cones
Landforms of Quezon